Joaquim Salvat Besora (born 18 December 1980) is a former Spanish-born Andorran international footballer and former futsal player who played as a forward.

He made his international debut for the Andorra national football team in 2011.

References

External links

1980 births
Living people
People from Baix Camp
Sportspeople from the Province of Tarragona
Andorran men's futsal players
Andorran footballers
Andorra international footballers
Spanish emigrants to Andorra
Association football forwards